In Deep was a British crime drama series created by Peter Jukes, starring Nick Berry and Stephen Tompkinson as undercover detectives Liam Ketman and Garth O'Hanlon.

Three series, comprising a total of twenty-two episodes, aired on BBC One between 19 February 2001 and 4 March 2003. A complete box set containing all three series was released on 9 July 2012.

Plot
Initial press releases of In Deep stated that life as an undercover detective is demanding. One slip-up can result in disaster, something that Liam Ketman (Nick Berry) and Garth O Hanlon (Stephen Tompkinson) know only too well. The pressure of leading complicated double lives means that sacrifices must be made for the job and the impact on their personal lives is immense." Liam Ketman is described as a family man whose marriage is under strain because of his job as an undercover detective. Garth O'Hanlon is described as a character apparently devoid of emotional or family entanglements who deals with often extreme violence as part of his job.

Actor Stephen Tompkinson said of the series, In Deep is a very gritty drama and not the kind of thing that I'm normally associated with. I think if the audience are expecting Ballykissangel or Grafters they're in for a surprise. This is not just another police show, it was seat of the pants stuff for us and the dramatic possibilities are endless. Tompkinson also commented on the work of real life undercover police officers. "There are only about 30 of these officers in this country, and they've got no fixed abode and no safety net when things go wrong, and it's terrifying really. They're always acting, pretending to be somebody else, and I found that fascinating that here was a real job with lives at risk, but where they act all the time. So In Deep is sort of a drama within a drama.

Tompkinson was forced to change his appearance radically for every episode to suit each individual undercover persona. Whilst researching material for the series, writer Peter Jukes spent several weeks with real-life undercover police officers that infiltrate hard-core criminal operations, in order to find out what life is really like for them. The first series was shot over the course of thirteen weeks in and around London.

Cast
 Nick Berry as Liam Ketman, detective sergeant
 Stephen Tompkinson as Garth O'Hanlon, detective constable
 Lisa Maxwell as Pamela Ketman, Liam's wife (Series 1—2)
 Karianne Henderson as Nicola Ketman, Liam's daughter (Series 1—3)
 Buster Reece as Max Ketman, Liam's son (Series 1—3)
 Meera Syal as Dr. Marta Drusic, police psychologist (Series 1)
 Fiona Allen as Dr. Sophie Masterson, police psychologist (Series 2—3)
 Vincenzo Pellegrino as Chris O'Hanlon, Garth's brother (Series 2)
 Carli Norris as Kelly Jensen, detective constable (Series 2)
 Kate Williams as Rose, Liam's mother-in-law (Series 3)

Episode list

Series Overview

Series 1: 19 February 2001 to 6 March 2001 (6 Episodes)
Series 2: 7 January 2002 to 29 January 2002 (8 Episodes)
Series 3: 10 February 2003 to 4 March 2003 (8 Episodes)

Series 1 (2001)

Series 2 (2002)

Series 3 (2003)

References

External links
 

2000s British drama television series
2001 British television series debuts
2003 British television series endings
BBC television dramas
2000s British crime television series
Television series by All3Media
English-language television shows
Television shows set in London